Hopea philippinensis is a species of plant in the family Dipterocarpaceae. It is endemic to the Philippines. It is an endangered species threatened by habitat loss.

References

philippinensis
Endemic flora of the Philippines
Trees of the Philippines
Taxonomy articles created by Polbot

Endangered flora of Asia